ʿUtaybah ibn Abī Lahab in pre-Islamic Arabia, was the son of Abū Lahab, he married Muhammad's third daughter Umm Kulthum, but divorced her before the marriage was consummated on his father's request. He was Muhammad's cousin.

Biography 
Utaybah was one of three sons of Abu Lahab, a staunch opponent of the prophet Muhammad. He was the only son of Abu Lahab who did not embrace Islam. He was married to Umm Kulthum bint Muhammad, the daughter of the prophet Muhammad, in 610 before the advent of his prophethood.

Divorce of Umm Kulthum and Death 
After the advent of prophethood of the prophet Muhammad, his initial preaching was kept secret among his closest friends. Later on, he went up to Mount Safa and called the people of Mecca. He asked them if they would believe him if raiders were behind the mountain approaching the city, and they affirmed his honesty throughout his 40 prior years of life in Mecca. He then warned his people of imminent punishment from God. This was the first public preaching of the prophet Muhammad. Abu Lahab then replied, "may you be destroyed today, did you gather us here for this?" And he opposed him, following him around Mecca, throwing stones at him until his legs bled, and calling him a liar while warning people not to accept Islam. Abu Lahab then told his sons to divorce the two daughters of the prophet Muhammad or he will never speak to them again.

'Utaybah bin Abi Lahab then approached the Prophet Muhammad and shouted at him, saying he disbelieves in the Qur'an and in his prophethood, citing chapter 53: "I disbelieve in: 'By the star when it goes down.' [Qur'an 53:1] and in 'Then he (Gabriel) approached and came closer.' [Qur'an 53:8] He then spat in front of the prophet and declared his divorce of the prophet Muhammad's daughter, Umm Kulthum. Thereupon, the Prophet invoked Allâh against 'Utaybah and supplicated: "O Allâh! Set one of Your dogs on him." Later, 'Utaybah set out for Syria with some of his compatriots from Quraysh and took accommodation in Az-Zarqa'. A lion approached the group and devoured Utaybah bin Abi Lahab.

In August 2011, researchers from the Hashemite University of the Queen Rania Institute for Tourism and Heritage were able to discover the historical site where the death occurred in the valley of Zarqa in Jordan, now known as the "Jannaa'ah" area adjacent to the stream of Zarqa.

References

Year of birth missing
Year of death missing
7th-century Arabs